The following chefs have appeared in Great British Menu cooking their own four-course menus: starter, fish, main, and dessert. From series five onward, for the finals weeks, the public vote used in the prior four series was abandoned in favor of a fourth (guest) judge. Furthermore, a chef judge/mentor, usually a previous contender of the series, scores the dishes accordingly, eliminates a third-place contender, and sends the top two highly-scored contenders to the judging round of a regional heat competition. From the fifth to seventh series, the fourth judge has been a previous contender.

Colour key:

Series 5 (2010)

 First appeared in series three to compete in the Scotland heat but was not selected to cook one's own menu.

Introduced in series 5

Lisa Allen

Richard Bainbridge

Lee Bennett

Tim Bilton

Derek Creagh

Richard Davies

Anthony Demetre

Henry Herbert
Henry Herbert, the head chef of the Coaches & Horses pub (Clerkenwell, central London) at the time, appeared in series five (2010) and was eliminated in the South West region heat before its judging round.

Will Holland

John Hooker

Tom Kerridge

Brian McCann

Niall McKenna

Johnnie Mountain

Tony Singh

Michael Smith

James Sommerin

Aled Williams

Series 6 (2011)

Introduced in series 6

Tom Aikens

Paul Ainsworth

Chris Bell

Bruno Birkbeck

Philip Carnegie

Sue Ellis

Chris Fearon

Andre Garrett

Aktar Islam

Garrett Jones

Hywel Jones

Stephanie Moon

Andrew Pern

Phil Thompson

Series 7 (2012)

Introduced in series 7

Colin Buchan

Paul Foster

Graham Garrett

Mark Greenaway

Phil Howard

Simon Hulstone

Charlie Lakin

Marcus McGuinness

Colin McGurran

Simon Rogan

References

Chefs